René Schmidt (born October 30, 1974) is a German former professional footballer who played for Dynamo Dresden, FSV Zwickau, KFC Uerdingen and VfB Leipzig.

External links

1974 births
Living people
German footballers
Association football midfielders
Dynamo Dresden players
FSV Zwickau players
1. FC Lokomotive Leipzig players
KFC Uerdingen 05 players
Bundesliga players
2. Bundesliga players